The Solsteinhaus is an Alpine Club hut belonging to the Austrian Alpine Club located at a height of  on the Erl Saddle (Erlsattel) between the mountains of the Nordkette and Erlspitze Group. It was opened in 1914 and totally renovated in 2007. It lies in the western Karwendel Alps in the state of Tyrol not far from the state capital of Innsbruck. Due to its central location and the numerous tour options it offers, the hut is a base for climbers taking part in tours of several days long, as well as a starting point for summit attempts. In addition the hut is a popular destination for hikers  who can easily do a day tour to the hut. In winter the hut is closed, but there is a winter room for ski tourers. During safe avalanche conditions, high Alpine ski tours can be undertaken to the surrounding summits; but these all require good experience.

Visit of Bruno the Bear / JJ1 
In the evening hours of 7 June 2006 a brown bear, JJ1, otherwise known as Bruno, was seen from the Solsteinhaus. On the following day several 15 to 20 centimetre large imprints of bear paws were found near the building.

Approaches 
 From Hochzirl (Mittenwald Railway) along the Hüttenweg, easy, time: 2.5 hours
 From Scharnitz through the valleys of Hinterautal, Gleirschtal and Großkristental, easy, time: 5 hours
 From Gießenbach (Mittenwald Railway) through the Eppzirler Tal and along the Eppzirler Scharte, medium, time: 5 hours

Crossings 
 Nördlinger Hut along the Freiungen Ridgeway (Freiungen-Höhenweg, easy route, partly a protected Klettersteig), time: 4.5 hours
 Eppzirler Alm along the Eppzirler Scharte, medium, time: 3 hours
 New Magdeburg Hut along the Zirler Schützensteig, time: 1.5 hours
 Pfeishut along the Gipfelstürmer Way (Gipfelstürmerweg), Frau Hitt Saddle, Seegrube, Hafelekarspitze and Goethe Way, challenging, time: 6 hours

Summit routes 
 Großer and Kleiner Solstein along the west flank, medium, time: 2–3 hours
 Kuhljochspitze along the Freiungen Ridgeway and the north arête, medium, time: 2 hours
 Erlspitze along  the south flank and the southeast arête, medium, time: 1.5 hours

Gallery

Literature 
 Walter Klier: Alpine Club Guide Karwendel alpin, 15. Auflage, 2005, Bergverlag Rudolf Rother, Munich,

References

External links 

 Home page of the Solsteinhaus

Mountain huts in Tyrol (state)
Karwendel